Mariaan de Swardt and Ruxandra Dragomir were the defending champions but only de Swardt competed that year with Katrina Adams.

Adams and de Swardt won in the final 6–0, 6–4 against Els Callens and Laurence Courtois.

Seeds
Champion seeds are indicated in bold text while text in italics indicates the round in which those seeds were eliminated.

 Katrina Adams /  Mariaan de Swardt (champions)
 Jill Hetherington /  Kristine Radford (first round)
 Els Callens /  Laurence Courtois (final)
 Kerry-Anne Guse /  Patricia Hy-Boulais (semifinals)

Draw

External links
 1996 Rover British Clay Court Championships Doubles Draw

British Hard Court Championships
1996 WTA Tour
Rover